Counter Investigation is a 2007 French crime film directed by Franck Mancuso that came out in 2007, with Jean Dujardin in the leading role. From a story by Lawrence Block, it is about a policeman whose young daughter is raped and murdered.

Plot 
When the young daughter of police captain Richard Malinowski is raped and murdered, his colleagues hastily find a suspect called Daniel Eckman. Despite there being no witnesses and no forensic evidence, he is sentenced to 30 years. From jail he starts writing to the policeman, expressing his deep regret for the death of the daughter and proclaiming his innocence. Doubts begin to surface in the mind of the policeman, who begins his own private enquiry. He finds that Salinas, a known serial killer of children, was in the area at the time of the killing.

As well as letters to the father, the prisoner has also been writing to Christine, a female sympathiser. He has a letter smuggled out to her, asking her to give false evidence on his behalf. A retrial is held and Eckman is freed, with compensation. Meeting Christine, he asks her to come away with him to a new life together, but she begins to have doubts about his honesty. He then rings Malinowski to ask if he can call round to thank him personally. Malinowski agrees, and gives him a whiskey full of sedative. When he comes to, he is bound in duct tape beside an open grave at the spot where the girl's body was found. Explaining that he always knew Eckman was his daughter's real killer, Malinowski buries him alive.

Cast

References

External links  
 

French crime films
2007 films
2000s crime films
French films about revenge
Rape and revenge films
2000s French films